Gina Altagracia Mambrú Casilla (born January 21, 1986 in Santo Domingo) is a volleyball player from the Dominican Republic, who played the 2012 Olympic Games and the 2014 World Championship ranking fifth in both competitions. She won the gold medal at the 2010 and 2014 Central American and Caribbean Games and bronze at the 2015 Pan American Games.

Early life
Altagracia used to be a ballet dancer before becoming a volleyball player for Los Cachorros club.

Career
Mambru played at the 2005 FIVB U20 Volleyball World Championship in Ankara, Turkey. Her team finished in 9th place. She played as opposite and wore the #16 jersey.

With her Junior National Team at the 2006 U-20 NORCECA Women´s Junior Continental Championship, she won the Best Attacker award. Her team won the silver medal.

Playing with the Brazilian team Vôlei Futuro for the 2009/2010 season, she won the "Best Server" award in the Brazilian Superliga (Superliga Brasileira de Voleibol).

2010
Playing in Chiapas, Mexico with her National Senior Team she won the 2010 Final Four Cup gold medal.

Mambrú was sidelined in October from the Dominican Republic 2010 FIVB World Championship squad, because she suffered a thrombosis, from she is recovered.

2011
In early 2011, Altagracia received for magnificent performance during 2010, making her the recipient of the 2010 Dominican Republic "Volleyball Player of the Year".

2012
Mambru played the 2012 Olympic tournament and her national team ranked 5th, after losing the quarterfinal match 3-0 against the United States.

2013
She won the Bronze Medal at the Montreux Volley Masters defeating Italy 3-1 after dropping the semifinals 0-3 from Brazil.

2015
Mambru helped her national team to win the Pan American Games bronze medal when they defeated the Puerto Rico national team 3-1. She was awarded tournament's Best Server.

Clubs
  Los Cachorros (2001–2005)
  Voley Sanse Mepaban (2006–2007)
  Distrito Nacional (2007)
  Sportway Challengers (2008)
  Centro Deportivo Nacional (2008)
  Ageo Medics (2008–2009)
  Vôlei Futuro (2009–2010)
  Distrito Nacional (2010)
  Beşiktaş (2014-2015)
  Mirador (2015)
  Südtirol Neruda Bolzano (2015-2016)
  Pgn Popsivo Polwan  (2016-2017)
  Pgn Popsivo Polwan (2019-2020)
 Ilbank Volleyball Club turquia (2020-2021)
 Jakarta Mandiri Popsivo Polwan (2022)

Awards

Individuals
 2006 NORCECA Women´s Junior Continental Championship U-20 "Best Spiker"
 2007 Dominican Volleyball League "Most Valuable Player"
 2010 Dominican Republic "Volleyball Player of the Year"
 2009/2010 Superliga Brasileira de Voleibol "Best Server"
 2010 World Championship NORCECA Qualification Pool H "Most Valuable Player"
 2010 World Championship NORCECA Qualification Pool H "Best Server"
 2013 FIVB World Grand Champions Cup "Best Opposite Spiker"
 2014 Central American and Caribbean Games "Best Server"
 2015 Pan American Games "Best Server"

National Team

U-20 National Team
 2006 NORCECA Women´s Junior Continental Championship U-20,  Silver Medal

Senior Team
 2008 Final Four Cup,  Silver Medal
 2009 NORCECA Championship,  Gold Medal
 2009 FIVB World Grand Champions Cup,  Bronze Medal
 2009 Pan-American Cup,  Silver Medal
 2009 Final Four Cup,  Bronze Medal
 2010 Final Four Women's Cup -  Gold Medal
 2010 Central American and Caribbean Games -  Gold Medal
 2010 Pan-American Cup -  Gold Medal
 2014 Central American and Caribbean Games -  Gold Medal

Clubs
 2007 Dominican Volleyball League -  Champion,  with Distrito Nacional
 2008 International Women’s Volleyball League -  3rd Place, with Sportway Challengers
 2013 Puerto Rican League -  Runner-Up, with Pinkin de Corozal
 2022 Indonesian Proliga -  3rd place, with Jakarta Mandiri Popsivo Polwan

References

External links
 FIVB profile

1986 births
Living people
Sportspeople from Santo Domingo
Dominican Republic women's volleyball players
Volleyball players at the 2012 Summer Olympics
Volleyball players at the 2015 Pan American Games
Pan American Games bronze medalists for the Dominican Republic
Olympic volleyball players of the Dominican Republic
Pan American Games medalists in volleyball
Central American and Caribbean Games gold medalists for the Dominican Republic
Competitors at the 2010 Central American and Caribbean Games
Competitors at the 2014 Central American and Caribbean Games
Opposite hitters
Expatriate volleyball players in Spain
Expatriate volleyball players in Japan
Expatriate volleyball players in Brazil
Expatriate volleyball players in Turkey
Expatriate volleyball players in Italy
Dominican Republic expatriate sportspeople in Spain
Dominican Republic expatriate sportspeople in Italy
Dominican Republic expatriate sportspeople in Japan
Dominican Republic expatriates in Brazil
Dominican Republic expatriate sportspeople in Trinidad and Tobago
Ageo Medics players
Central American and Caribbean Games medalists in volleyball
Medalists at the 2015 Pan American Games
20th-century Dominican Republic women
21st-century Dominican Republic women